The women's 5000 metres event at the 2019 European Athletics U23 Championships was held in Gävle, Sweden, at Gavlehof Stadium Park on 14 July.

Results

References

5000
5000 metres at the European Athletics U23 Championships